The following lists notable events that will occur and take place during 2023 in Sri Lanka.

Incumbents

National

Provincial

Governors
 Central Province – Lalith U Gamage
 Eastern Province – Anuradha Yahampath
 North Central Province – Maheepala Herath
 Northern Province – Jeevan Thiagarajah
 North Western Province – Wasantha Karannagoda
 Sabaragamuwa Province – Tikiri Kobbekaduwa
 Southern Province – Willy Gamage
 Uva Province – A. J. M. Muzammil
 Western Province – Roshan Goonatilake

Chief Ministers
 Central Province – Vacant
 Eastern Province – Vacant
 North Central Province – Vacant
 Northern Province – Vacant
 North Western Province – Vacant
 Sabaragamuwa Province – Vacant
 Southern Province – Vacant
 Uva Province – Vacant
 Western Province – Vacant

Ongoing events
 COVID-19 pandemic in Sri Lanka
 2019–present Sri Lankan economic crisis
 2022–2023 monkeypox outbreak in Asia

Events by month

January
 10 January – Canada imposes sanctions on former presidents Mahinda Rajapaksa and Gotabaya Rajapaksa and two members of the Sri Lankan Army, Staff Sergeant Sunil Ratnayake and Lieutenant Commander Chandana Prasad Hettiarachchi, over “gross and systematic violations of human rights” during the Sri Lankan Civil War.
 20 January
 The first ever 3D Sri Lankan animation film Gajaman is released theatrically.
 Seven people are killed and dozens are injured by a school bus collision in Colombo.

February
 4 February – The 75th anniversary of Sri Lankan independence from the British Empire.

Predicted and scheduled events
 25 April – 2023 Sri Lankan local elections
 June–July – The Pakistan cricket team is scheduled to tour Sri Lanka to play two test matches against the Sri Lankan cricket team. Test matches played in the series will be part of the 2023–2025 ICC World Test Championship.

Deaths

January
 5 January – Buddhi Wickrama, 83, (actor)
 13 January – Reginald Cooray, 75 (politician)
 19 January – Sumitra Peries, 88, (filmmaker)

February
 3 February – Oswald Gomis, 90, (former Archbishop of Colombo (2002–2009) and former chancellor of the University of Colombo (2002–2021))

March
 5 March – Heen Banda Dissanayaka, 85, (civil servant, former governor of the Central Bank of Ceylon)

References

 
Years of the 21st century in Sri Lanka
2020s in Sri Lanka
Sri Lanka
Sri Lanka